The Parkchester station is an express station on the IRT Pelham Line of the New York City Subway. It is located above Hugh J. Grant Circle in the Parkchester neighborhood of the Bronx, where East 177th Street (the Cross Bronx Expressway service road), Metropolitan Avenue, and Westchester Avenue intersect. The station is served by the 6 train at all times and the <6> train during weekdays in the peak direction.

By passenger count, Parkchester was the third-busiest station in the Bronx in 2017, behind 161st Street–Yankee Stadium and Third Avenue–149th Street, and the busiest station on the Pelham Line.

History
Parkchester station opened on May 30, 1920.

This station was rehabilitated in 2010.

In 2019, as part of an initiative to increase the accessibility of the New York City Subway system, the MTA announced that it would install elevators at the Parkchester station as part of the MTA's 2020–2024 Capital Program. In December 2022, the MTA announced that it would award a $146 million contract for the installation of eight elevators across four stations, including Parkchester. The work would include demolishing an existing escalator to make way for an elevator.

Station layout 

Parkchester is an express station with three tracks and two island platforms. The 6 stops on the outer local tracks while the <6> stops on the center express track. There are 1950s-style mushroom-shaped lights at the end of the platforms and the staircases to the mezzanine are sheltered. Just north of the station is a signal tower which was used until the late 1990s, when a new master tower was created in Westchester Yard.

When <6> express trains operate, 6 local trains terminate here. After discharging passengers on the northbound local track, terminating trains use the center track past switches north of the station as a pocket track to relay.

All trains continuing on the IRT Pelham Line north of this station make all subsequent stops, these stations are only served by the <6> in the peak direction when it is operating, and the 6 at all other times.

Exit
The station's only exit is a mezzanine in the center of the Hugh Grant Circle, a traffic circle. It has a crossunder and windows in a simulated 12-pane pattern similar to those at Whitlock Avenue. The fare control is at street level and the room features a painting entitled Live The Dream. There is an escalator from fare control to the southbound platform, bypassing the mezzanine.

Image gallery

References

External links 

 
 nycsubway.org — Live the Dream Artwork (Artist and date unknown)
 Station Reporter — 6 Train
 Map of Bronx Subways
 The Subway Nut — Parkchester – East 177th Street Pictures
 Hugh Grant Circle (west) entrance from Google Maps Street View
 Hugh Grant Circle (east) entrance from Google Maps Street View
 Platforms from Google Maps Street View

IRT Pelham Line stations
New York City Subway stations in the Bronx
Railway stations in the United States opened in 1920
1920 establishments in New York City
Parkchester, Bronx